The 1935 WANFL season was the 51st season of the Western Australian National Football League. The season saw West Perth win the premiership under the coaching of Johnny Leonard; it was the only time in West Perth's history that it won consecutive premierships, preceding a brief but exceptionally steep decline that saw the Cardinals four years later suffer the equal longest losing streak in WA(N)FL history.

This season saw Claremont-Cottesloe under new president Pat Rodriguez change its name to Claremont, and at first gave promise of great improvement before returning to their worst 1934 form. 1934 finalists Victoria Park lost defenders Shepherd, A. Brown, Hungerford and Patrick Fitzgerald in the off-season to retirement of major injuries and failed to cope with these problems, finishing last for the only time in open-age competition between 1924 and 1980. In contrast, Subiaco, who had been disappointing in 1934 with just seven victories, regained Lou Daily from Geelong and Collingwood to signal the end of a major exodus to the VFL. Daily's brilliant play in defence, and the acquisition of Frank Murphy from the Magpies as captain-coach, made the Maroons the best team in the competition for much of 1935, but West Perth's defence was too much in the Grand Final and Subiaco were to have a third of a century as a cellar-dweller before their next premiership in 1973.

The Sandover Medal count was marred by overlooking a clause in the rules to deal with a tie – Lou Daily was initially awarded the Medal on the casting vote of WANFL President Walter Stooke and became the first full-back to win a "best-and-fairest" medal in any leading Australian Rules state, but on 21 September it was pointed out that George Krepp should have won through having received one more three-vote than Daily. Ultimately the WANFL had no choice but to strike a second medal, which was given to Krepp at the League meeting on 16 October.

Home-and-away season

Round 1 (Labour Day)

Round 2

Round 3

Round 4

Round 5 (Foundation Day)

Round 6

Round 7

First interstate match

Second interstate match

Round 8

Round 9

Round 10

WANFL Second XVIII v Goldfields

Round 11

Round 12

Round 13

Round 14

Round 15

Round 16

Round 17

Round 18

Ladder

Finals

First semi-final

Second semi-final

Preliminary final

Grand Final

Notes
WANFL President Walter Stooke gave a casting vote to Daily, but Bob Bryant noted that Krepp had received eight first votes to Daily's seven, and should according to the "countback" rule of the time have won, so that the WANFL had to strike a second medal.The "first eighteen" of Western Australia was in Adelaide playing South Australia for this weekend.

References

External links
 Official WAFL site
 Western Australian National Football League (WANFL) 1935

West Australian Football League seasons
1935 in Australian rules football